White Lodging Services Corporation is a privately held American hotel management company. As of 2022, it manages about 50 hotels.

White Lodging was founded in 1985 by Bruce W. White, who was the company's chairman. In January 2022, Jean-Luc Barone was named the company's CEO, replacing Ken Barrett who remains as president. The company is headquartered in Merrillville, Indiana.

In 2014 and 2015, White Lodging was the subject of data security breaches at numerous locations that it manages. In December 2017, White Lodging announced that it would be selling 82 of its suburban hotel management contracts to Interstate Hotels & Resorts, cutting its hotel portfolio in half and resulting in the loss of more than 50 corporate office staff.

References

Merrillville, Indiana
1985 establishments in Indiana